Julius Albert Krug (November 23, 1907March 26, 1970) was a politician who served as the United States Secretary of the Interior for the administration of President Harry S. Truman from 1946 until 1949.

Early life and education
Krug was born November 23, 1907, in Madison, Wisconsin, to son of Julius J. Krug (1877–1971) and the former Emma M. Korfmacher (1877–1949). Krug graduated from what is now the University of Wisconsin–Madison in 1929.

Career 
His first notable jobs were with the Tennessee Valley Authority, where he started working as chief power engineer in 1938, and then manager of power in 1940. In 1941, Krug was promoted to chief of the power branch of the Office of Production Management. After the beginning of World War II, this office became the War Production Board. Krug was promoted to director of the Office of War Utilities in 1943. In April 1944, Krug enlisted in the United States Navy. He was recalled that August to serve as chairman of the War Production Board, where he served until the board's dissolution in November 1945.

Secretary of the Interior

President Truman nominated Krug for the position of Secretary of the Interior on February 26, and he assumed office on March 18, 1946. As Secretary, Krug opposed lumber companies' efforts to gain logging rights to huge forests in Washington state, and opposed the building of unnecessary dams. As the administrator of coal mines in the United States, he led failed negotiations between John L. Lewis and mine owners in an attempt to end a nationwide strike by the United Mine Workers of America. 

In 1948, Krug signed a contract whereby the tribe living at the Fort Berthold Indian Reservation in North Dakota was forced to sell 155,000 acres of its land for the Garrison Dam and reservoir project in New Town, North Dakota. The reservoir flooded one-quarter of the reservation, destroying the tribal headquarters, the hospital, and 154,000 acres of fertile farm land. George Gillette, chairman of the Mandan, Hidatsa, and Arikara Nation, commented in 1948:

In August 1949, Krug chaired the 19-member United States Citizens Committee that participated in the United Nations Scientific Conference on Conservation and Utilization of Resources, held at Lake Success, New York. Other members of the committee included Herbert Hoover, Thomas Watson, Howard E. Babcock, and Randolph Greene Pack.

Later career
Krug resigned from the cabinet effective on December 1, 1949, and he moved on to the private industry as a utilities consultant in Washington. He also served as the chairman of the board of Brookside Mills, and a cofounded the Volunteer Asphalt Company in the Knoxville, Tennessee.

Personal life 
Krug died in Knoxville, Tennessee on March 26, 1970, at the age of 62, and is interred at Arlington National Cemetery in Arlington, Virginia. He and his wife, Margaret Catherine Dean, had two children; a daughter, Marilyn Krug Grether, and a son, James Allen Krug.

Popular culture 
Krug's affair with Edith Bouvier Beale of Grey Gardens fame is portrayed in the HBO original film Grey Gardens (2009).

Gallery

Media
Krug is portrayed by actor Daniel Baldwin in the HBO original film Grey Gardens (2009).

References

External links
 

1907 births
1970 deaths
Politicians from Madison, Wisconsin
Military personnel from Wisconsin
United States Navy personnel of World War II
Burials at Arlington National Cemetery
United States Secretaries of the Interior
University of Wisconsin–Madison alumni
Truman administration cabinet members
20th-century American politicians